Calogero is a name of Italian origin. See the linked article for a list of persons with this name.

Calogero may also refer to:

Calogero (singer) (born 1971), French singer songwriter
Calogero (album), 2002 album of the French Italian singer songwriter Calogero
San Calogero, comune (municipality) in the Province of Vibo Valentia in the Italian region Calabria